Jeff Chapman AM (born 22 February 1948) is a former Australian rules footballer who played with Melbourne in the Victorian Football League (VFL). He is also the founder of the Bangarra Group, a private family office that owns Bennelong Funds Management, an investment management business, and the Bennelong Foundation, a philanthropic foundation.

On 26 January 2019, Chapman was appointed as a Member (AM) in the General Division of the Order of Australia as part of the Australia Day honours, receiving the award "for significant service to the community through philanthropic initiatives".

Notes

External links 		

		
1948 births
Living people
Australian rules footballers from Victoria (Australia)
Melbourne Football Club players
People educated at Carey Baptist Grammar School